Events from the year 1956 in Ireland.

Incumbents
 President: Seán T. O'Kelly
 Taoiseach: John A. Costello (FG)
 Tánaiste: William Norton (Lab)
 Minister for Finance: Gerard Sweetman (FG)
 Chief Justice: Conor Maguire
 Dáil: 15th
 Seanad: 8th

Events
15 February – Senator Owen Sheehy-Skeffington introduced a motion calling for the prohibition of all corporal punishment for girls in Irish national schools.
2 April – President Seán T. O'Kelly unveiled a bust of Countess Markievicz in St Stephen's Green, Dublin.
21 May – President Seán T. O'Kelly opened the first Cork International Film Festival.
29 May – T. K. Whitaker was appointed new Secretary at the Department of Finance.
12 August – The Gaelic Athletic Association postponed the All-Ireland Hurling and Football Finals due to an outbreak of polio.
21 November – Our Lady's Hospital for Sick Children was opened in Crumlin, Dublin.
30 November – Petrol rationing was due to be introduced from 1 January due to the Suez Crisis.
1 December – At the Olympic Games in Melbourne, Australia, Ronnie Delany won Ireland's first gold medal for 24 years.
12 December – The Irish Republican Army launched its Border Campaign in Northern Ireland with the bombing of a BBC relay transmitter in County Londonderry, burning of a courthouse in Magherafelt by a unit led by 18-year-old Seamus Costello, and of an Ulster Special Constabulary post near Newry and blowing up of a half-built British Army barracks at Enniskillen. A raid on Gough Barracks in Armagh was beaten off after a brief exchange of fire.
Undated
Robert Briscoe became the first Jewish Lord Mayor of Dublin.

Arts and literature
 June – Painter Louis le Brocquy represented Ireland at the Venice Biennale.
 Samuel Beckett's novel Malone Dies was published in English.

Sport

Association football
League of Ireland
Winners: St Patrick's Athletic

FAI Cup
Winners: Shamrock Rovers 3–2 Cork Athletic.

Births
1 January – John O'Donohue, poet and philosopher (died 2008).
16 January – Denis Moran, Kerry Gaelic footballer.
17 January – Joe Hennessy, Kilkenny hurler.
27 January – Joe Duffy, radio presenter.
11 February – Pat Carroll, Offaly hurler (died 1986).
13 February – Liam Brady, international soccer player.
21 February – Johnny Crowley, Cork hurler.
4 March – Ciarán Brennan, singer, songwriter, producer and instrumentalist.
13 April – Jim Lynagh, Provisional Irish Republican Army member killed in an ambush by the SAS during an attack on Loughgall RUC station (died 1987).
16 April – Paul Drechsler, businessman.
29 April – Kevin Moran, Gaelic footballer and soccer player.
30 April – Liam T. Cosgrave, Fine Gael politician, Cathaoirleach of Seanad Éireann 1996–1997
4 May – Steve Barron, film director and producer.
5 May – Mary Coughlan, singer.
9 May – Brendan Howlin, national teacher, Labour Party Teachta Dála for Wexford and Cabinet Minister.
15 May – Pat Byrne, soccer player and manager.
18 May – Pat Fleury, Offaly hurler, manager.
21 May – Sean Kelly, cyclist and broadcaster.
24 May – Michael Jackson, Church of Ireland Bishop of Clogher.
28 May – John O'Donoghue, Fianna Fáil TD for Kerry South and Cabinet Minister.
1 June – Brendan Smith, Fianna Fáil TD for Cavan–Monaghan and Minister of State.
4 June – Gerry Ryan, RTÉ radio presenter. (Died 30 April 2010)
7 June – Marty Whelan, RTÉ radio and television presenter.
1 July – Liz O'Donnell, Deputy Leader of the Progressive Democrats, TD and Minister of State.
10 July – Frank Stapleton, soccer player and manager.
12 July – Cathal Ó Searcaigh, poet.
August – Denis Mulcahy, Cork hurler.
26 August – Dick Hooper, long-distance runner.
5 September – Willie Mullins, jockey, racehorse trainer.
4 October – Mary Kennedy, television presenter.
13 October – Joe Connolly, Galway hurler.
1 November – Charles Flanagan, Fine Gael TD for Laois–Offaly.
5 November – Marita Conlon-McKenna, children's writer.
4 December – Nia Griffith Welsh Labour Member of Parliament (United Kingdom).
19 December – Shane McEntee, Fine Gael TD for Meath East.
Undated
Patrick Cassidy, composer.
Dorothy Cross, sculptor and installation artist.
Frankie Gavin, fiddle and flute player.
Alice Maher, painter and sculptor.
Valerie Mulvin, architect.
Tadhg Murphy, Cork hurler.
Richie Reid, Kilkenny hurler.
Fran Rooney, businessman.

Deaths
30 January – Sir John Keane, 5th Baronet, barrister, member of Seanad (born 1873).
20 February – James Cousins, poet and writer (born 1873).
21 February – Louis Meldon, cricketer (born 1886).
13 March – Alfie Byrne, Irish Nationalist politician, served both as an MP in the British House of Commons and as a TD in Dáil Éireann (born 1882).
18 March – Benjamin Glazer, Academy Award-winning writer, producer and director (born 1887).
19 March – Matt Goff, Kildare Gaelic footballer (born 1901).
24 March – Bob Lambert, cricketer (born 1874).
20 April – Ida Mary Costello, wife of Taoiseach John A. Costello (born 1891).
17 May – John Tudor Gwynn, cricketer (born 1881).
22 May – Elizabeth Cronin, traditional singer (born 1879).
11 June – Seán Óg Murphy, Cork hurler, Gaelic Athletic Association administrator (born 1892).
23 July – Ella Young, poet (born 1867).
5 August – J. M. Andrews, second Prime Minister of Northern Ireland (born 1871).
23 September – Arthur Duff, composer and conductor (born 1899).
6 November – Leo Whelan, painter (born 1892).
19 November – Thomas Derrig, Fianna Fáil TD and Cabinet Minister (born 1897).
25 November – Robert Bruce Bowers, cricketer (born 1897).
11 December – Frederic Charles Dreyer, British Royal Navy Admiral (born 1878).
27 December – Lambert McKenna, Jesuit priest and writer (born 1870).
Undated – Geoffrey Taylor, born Jeoffrey Phibbs, poet (born 1900 in England).

References

 
1950s in Ireland
Ireland
Years of the 20th century in Ireland